Cotswold District Council in Gloucestershire, England is elected every four years.

Political control
Since the first elections to the council in 1973 political control of the council has been held by the following parties:

Leadership
The leaders of the council since 2003 have been:

Council elections
1973 Cotswold District Council election
1976 Cotswold District Council election
1979 Cotswold District Council election (New ward boundaries)
1983 Cotswold District Council election
1987 Cotswold District Council election
1991 Cotswold District Council election (New ward boundaries & district boundary changes also took place)
1995 Cotswold District Council election
1999 Cotswold District Council election
2003 Cotswold District Council election (New ward boundaries reduced the number of seats by 1)
2007 Cotswold District Council election (Some new ward boundaries)
2011 Cotswold District Council election
2015 Cotswold District Council election (New ward boundaries)
2019 Cotswold District Council election

By-election results

1995-1999

1999-2003

2003-2007

2007-2011

2011-2015

2015-present

References

By-election results

External links
Cotswold District Council

 
Council elections in Gloucestershire
District council elections in England